Qillqata (Aymara qillqaña to write, -ta a suffix, "written" or "something written", also spelled Killkata) is a  mountain in the Bolivian Andes. It is located in the Cochabamba Department, Tapacari Province. Qillqata lies between the Tallija River and the Ch'amak Uma ("dark water", Chamaj Uma).

References 

Mountains of Cochabamba Department